John Vickery is an American stage and film actor known for his work in Babylon 5 and Star Trek.

Life and career
He attended the University of California at Davis, where he pursued a degree in mathematics. After graduating from Davis, he studied acting in London and worked in many productions in New York City. Vickery was trained in Professional Acting at Drama Studio London.

In Babylon 5, he played both Neroon and Mr. Welles. Vickery would also make a guest appearance as the latter in the Babylon 5 spin-off, Crusade. His largest Star Trek role was as Rusot, a member of Damar's Cardassian resistance group, appearing in the Star Trek: Deep Space Nine episodes "The Changing Face of Evil", "When It Rains…" and "Tacking into the Wind". He also played a Betazoid in the Star Trek: The Next Generation episode "Night Terrors" and a Klingon in the Star Trek: Enterprise episode "Judgment". He portrayed the Auctioneer in the Pirates of the Caribbean short film Tales of the Code: Wedlocked.

Vickery also originated the role of Scar in The Lion King. Before performing, he would often read of a Robert Graves poem, most famously Fairies and Fusiliers. His other Broadway credits include The Sisters Rosensweig, The Real Thing, and Eminent Domain. He performs frequently at the nation's leading regional theaters including South Coast Repertory, Mark Taper Forum, Old Globe Theatre, McCarter Theatre, and Long Wharf Theatre.

His film work includes Jürgen Vsych's short film Son for Sail.

He voiced the character Legolas in the 1979 radio adaptation of The Lord of the Rings.  He was also the voice of Kenshiro in the 1986 film, Fist of the North Star and Teknoman Dagger in Tekkaman Blade. In the video game version of Dante's Inferno, Vickery plays the voice of Lucifer, the main antagonist.

John has one daughter named Alexandria.

Stage Credits

References

External links

Unofficial site at the John Vickery Unofficial Homepage

 John Vickery - Working in the Theatre Seminar video at American Theatre Wing.org, April 1998
John Vickery - about the artists: The Production History of the World (Enter John Vickery in  Search Artist Name Box)

Living people
20th-century American male actors
21st-century American male actors
American male film actors
American male television actors
American male voice actors
Place of birth missing (living people)
1950 births